James Oatley (12 August 1845 – 17 December 1925) was an Australian cricketer. He played two first-class matches for New South Wales between 1865/66 and 1868/69.

See also
 List of New South Wales representative cricketers

References

External links
 

1845 births
1925 deaths
Australian cricketers
New South Wales cricketers
Cricketers from Sydney